Dents Run is an unincorporated community in Benezette Township, Elk County, Pennsylvania, United States. It has attracted attention from treasure hunters and the media as the reputed site of a lost shipment of gold. The FBI conducted excavation activities in Dents Run in 2018.

Further reading
Pennsylvania Visitors Bureau. Legend of The Lost Gold of Dent's Run. March 3, 2020
The Atlantic. A Lost Trove of Civil War Gold, an FBI Excavation, and Some Very Angry Treasure Hunters June 17, 2022

Notes

Unincorporated communities in Elk County, Pennsylvania
Unincorporated communities in Pennsylvania